Vladimir Nikolayevich Yemelyanov (20 June 1911 – 2 July 1975) was a Soviet actor and producer who appeared in 42 films between 1953 and 1975. He is most known for Road to Life (1955), The Immortal Garrison (1956) and Planeta Bur (1962).

In  Motovilikhinsky City District of Perm, there is an actor Yemelyanov's street. He died on 2 July 1975, during the filming of a movie in Donetsk.

Selected filmography

 Hostile Whirlwinds (1953) - Dzerzhinsky
 School of Courage (1954) - Guerilla Leadr
 Certificate of Maturity (1954) - Listovskiy, otetts Valentina
 Least We Forget (1954) - Sekretar obkoma
 Road to Life (1955) - Anton Semyonovich Makarenko
 Sailor Chizhik (1956) - Vasiliy Luzgin, kapitan 2-go ranga
 More zovyot (1956) - Fyodor Mikhaylovich
 The Immortal Garrison (1956) - Pyotr Kondratyev
 Eto nachinalos tak... (1956)
 An Unusual Summer (1957) - Pyotr Ragosyn
 Trubachyov's Detachment Is Fighting (1957)
 Sluchay v pustyne (1957) - Colonel
 Sasha Enters Life (1957) - Party Leader (Tugoi uzel version)
 Tsel ego zhizni (1958) - Selivanov
 The Variegateds Case (1958) - Innokentiy Grigorev
 Flagi na bashnyakh (1958) - Anton Semyonovich Makarenko
 Esimese järgu kapten (1958) - Viktor Zheleznov - vitse admiral
 Sonnensucher (1958) - Oberst Fedossjew
 I Was a Satellite of the Sun (1959) - Igor Petrovich Kalinin
 Furqat (1959) - Governor-General
 First Captain (1959)
 Goryachaya dusha (1960)
 Far from the Motherland (1960) - Rabochiy benzokolonki
 A Man Changes Skin (1960) - Komarenko
 Vodil poyezda mashinist (1961)
 Planeta Bur (1962) - Ilya Vershinin
 Kogda razvodyat mosty (1963)
 Silense (1964) - Nikolay Vokhmintsev
 Come Here, Mukhtar! (1964) - Sergey Prokofyevich mayor
 Across the Cemetery (1965) - Vasiliy Yegorovich Bugreyev
 Pomni, Kaspar! (1965)
 Skvoz ledyanuyu mglu (1965) - Police Chief
 Nights of Farewell (1965) - Ivan Vsevolozhsky
 Nepokoryonnyy batalyon (1965) - Dobrovolskiy
 I'm going to search (1966) - Colonel Itsenko
 Chiisai tôbôsha (1966)
 Ikh znali tolko v litso (1967) - vitse-admiral Reinhardt
 Dikiy myod (1967)
 Tsygan (1967) - Timofey Ilyich
 Vernost materi (1967)
 Parol ne nuzhen (1967)
 Zapomnim etot den (1968) - Minsk Council Chairman
 Anyutyna doroga (1968) - Platon Pavlovich
 Razvedchiki (1969) - General-mayor
 Povest' o chekiste (1969) - Kazanskiy
 King Lear (1970) - Kent
 Risk (1971) - General razvedki
 Poslanniki vechnosti (1971) - Minister
 Nochnaya smena (1971) - Biryukov
 Yegor Bulychyov and Others (1972) - Mokei Bashkin
 Lyogkaya voda (1972) - Khovrin
 Zhizn na greshnoy zemle (1973)
 Nadezhda (1973) - General
 Opoznanie (1973) - Judge Stanley
 Kto, esli ne ty... (1974) - Pyotr Petrovich Komarov
 Stoyanka - tri chasa (1975) - Direktor zavoda
 Georgiy Sedov (1975) - Petrov-Gimalaysky
 V ozhidanii chuda (1975) - Nikolai Fomich
 Dozhit do rassveta (1977)

References

External links

1911 births
1975 deaths
Actors from Perm, Russia
People from Permsky Uyezd
Soviet male stage actors
Soviet male film actors
People's Artists of the RSFSR
Honored Artists of the RSFSR
Mass media people from Perm, Russia